This is a partial list of rivers of the Rocky Mountains in Canada and the United States.  For a full listing of rivers in the Canadian portion of the range, see List of rivers of the Canadian Rockies.

Gulf of Mexico drainage
 Rio Grande
 Pecos River
 Missouri River
 Jefferson River
 Beaverhead River
 Red Rock River
 Ruby River
 Big Hole River
 Wise River
 Madison River
 Firehole River
 Gibbon River
 Gallatin River
 Cheyenne River
 Dearborn River
 Sun River
 Smith River
 Marias River
 Milk River
 Judith River
 Kansas River
 Musselshell River
 Yellowstone River
 Lamar River
 Gardner River
 Shields River
 Boulder River
 Stillwater River
 Clarks Fork Yellowstone River
 Bighorn River also known as Wind River
 Tongue River
 Powder River
 Platte River
 North Platte River
 South Platte River
 Arkansas River

Arctic Ocean drainage
 Athabasca River
 Peace River
 Parsnip River
 Misinchinka River
 Finlay River
 Liard River
 Muskwa River 
 Kechika River
 Gataga River
 Toad River

Northwest Pacific Ocean drainage
 Columbia River
 Kicking Horse River
 Blaeberry River
 Bush River
 Wood River
 Bitterroot River
 Kootenay River
 Elk River
 Bull River
 Vermilion River
 Clark Fork River
 Clearwater River
 Coeur d'Alene River
 Salmon River
 Snake River
 Malad River
 Payette River
 Selway River
 Lochsa River
 Fraser River
 McGregor River
 Thompson River

Gulf of California drainage
 Colorado River
 Gunnison River
 Dolores River
 San Miguel River
 Green River
 Price River
 San Rafael River
 White River
 Bear River
 Yampa River
 San Juan River
 Navajo River
 Piedra River
 Los Pinos River
 Animas River

Hudson Bay drainage
 South Saskatchewan River
 North Saskatchewan River
 Bow River
 Oldman River
 Red Deer River

Great Basin drainage
 Bear River
Malad River
Little Bear River
Logan River
Cub River
Bear Lake
 Jordan River
 American Fork
 Big Cottonwood Creek
 Hobble Creek
 Provo River
 Spanish Fork
 Weber River
 East Canyon Creek
San Pitch River

See also
 Rocky Mountains
 List of rivers of the Canadian Rockies
 List of rivers of the Pacific Ranges
 List of rivers of the Kitimat Ranges
 List of rivers of the Boundary Ranges
 List of rivers of the Omineca Mountains

Rivers
History of the Rocky Mountains
Rocky Mountains
Rocky Mountains
Rivers of the Rocky Mountains